The G.A. Dentzel Company was an American builder of carousels in Philadelphia, Pennsylvania, United States, in the late 19th and early 20th centuries.

History
Its founder, Gustav Dentzel, had immigrated to the United States in 1860, from Germany. Having carved carousels for his father before immigrating he opened a cabinet making shop on Germantown Ave. in Philadelphia. He soon tired of the cabinet making business and decided to try his hand at building a small portable carousel that he could travel with around the country. After finding that people had a great enthusiasm for his carousel he decided to go into the carousel building business full-time in 1867, hiring other woodworkers who had also emigrated from Europe.

His son William took over the business after Gustav's death in 1909, and continued making carousels until 1928, with employees such as master-carvers Salvatore "Cherni" Cernigliaro and Daniel Muller. After William's death, Muller went on to form his own carousel company, while the Dentzel equipment and remaining stock were sold to the Philadelphia Toboggan Company.

In mid-2017, an estimate indicated that there may be 150 of the Dentzel units in existence. At that time, a model from 1907, with 52 hand-carved animals, was sold by Centreville Amusement Park in Toronto, Ontario, to the city of Carmel, Indiana. The selling price was an estimated CAD $3 million, approximately US $2.25 million. The ride will open in 2018 or 2019 as part of a multi-year downtown redevelopment project.

Operating Carousels (in USA)

Gallery

References

External links
antiquecarousels.com 
dentzel.weebly.com
Carousels.org
Pjs-carousel.com
albanycarousel.com
Dentzel Carousel at the San Francisco Zoo

Amusement Ride Manufacturers
Gustav Dentzel
Carousel manufacturers